Eduant Private Russian School is a Russian international school in Antalya, Turkey. It was established in 2000. As of 2014 it had 120 students in its compulsory education section. Many Ukrainian students arrived in Antalya due to the 2014 pro-Russian unrest in Ukraine. The school offers English, Turkish and German as foreign languages.

See also
 Russians in Turkey

References

External links
  "Rus okulunda ilk zil çaldı" (Archive). Bizim Antalya
  "Özel Eduant Rus Okulu'nda karne heyecanı" (Archive). Antalya Burada. 23 May 2015.
  "Rus Okulu Eduant Konyaaltı'nda Kampüs Kuruyor" (Archive). InvestRoyal.

Russian international schools in Turkey
Education in Antalya
2000 establishments in Turkey
Educational institutions established in 2000